The 1899 Add-Ran Christian football team represented Add-Ran Christian University—now known as Texas Christian University (TCU)—as an independent during the 1899 college football season. They played only one game, against Baylor.

Schedule

References

Add-Ran Christian
TCU Horned Frogs football seasons
College football undefeated seasons
College football winless seasons
Add-Ran Christian football